Woodford County is a county located in the state of Illinois. The 2020 United States Census listed its population at 38,467. Its county seat is Eureka. Woodford County is part of the Peoria, IL, Metropolitan Statistical Area. Its name comes from General William Woodford, an officer of the American Revolutionary War who served at the brutal military encampment at Valley Forge, Pennsylvania.

History

Establishment
Woodford County is part of what was formerly the homelands of several Native American peoples, including the Potawatomi, the Meskwaki, and the Sauk peoples. It was located just south of the land of the Illiniwek. The western portion of the county in particular shows much archeological evidence of having supported extensive First Nations populations.

At the time of the American Revolutionary War, three competing American colonies — Massachusetts, Virginia, and Connecticut — claimed part of what is today the state of Illinois. The matter was solved in 1778 when Virginia amalgamated lands in the region into a massive county called Illinois, borrowing the name of a native people. Indiana Territory was formed in 1800 with William Henry Harrison as Governor; the future Illinois was part of this territory. It was not until 1809 that Illinois Territory was formally established as an official territory of the United States of America. Statehood followed in December 1818.

The first organized Anglo settlements in the future Woodford County region appeared in the 1820s. First settlement in the county came at Spring Bay, with pioneers managing to select the same ground occupied by an ancient Indian  burial site which ran north-and-south through the entire settlement. The location was chosen due to its proximity to the Illinois River.

In the 1870s, an early historian of Woodford County wrote:
There were a few Indians in the county at the time of settlement by the whites, but the two races did not come into conflict to any extent. The advancing wave of civilization seemed to follow up the retreating wave of barbarism. The first settlers encountered a few Indians...and in 1832 were involved to some extent in the Black Hawk War, but the active operations were further north than Woodford County.

The current boundaries of the county were not those originally drawn; moreover, the names of various counties in the region changed frequently The Eastern portion of Woodford County was known as Edwards (1814–16), Crawford (1816–19), Clark (1819–21), and Fayette (1821-25) Counties, while the Western part of today's county was included in Madison (1814–17), Bond (1817–21), and Sangamon (1821–25) Counties.

In 1827 new lines were drawn and Tazewell County was established, including all of today's Woodford County. Settlers began arriving from neighboring territories during the early 1830s. This led to the formal creation of Woodford County along its current boundaries in February 1841 from a portion of Tazewell County and a portion of McLean County that had been part of Tazewell County before 1830.

The county was named for Woodford County, Kentucky, which was in turn named after General William Woodford, who served with General George Washington at Valley Forge, Pennsylvania during the brutal winter of 1777–78.

The first post office in today's Woodford County was established in 1836 at Partridge township, named for local tribal leader Black Partridge. Also in 1836, the area's first (private) school was founded, by Miss Betsy Page. The first public school followed shortly thereafter. The first Sunday school was established in 1837 in the home of Parker Morse in Cazenovia.

Pioneer life

The first settlers of Woodford County occupied crude log cabins. Windows were covered with oiled papers; doors and floors were constructed of rough boards split from trees and held together with wooden pegs. Construction of the cabins was primitive, with the floor plan generally involving a single room heated with a fireplace.

Meat was frequently roasted on a spit; cornbread was generally baked on the fireplace coals. A common staple of pioneer life was waffles, baked from batter in a folding iron mold three or four feet long. Modern canning processes were unknown and the wintertime larder consisted primarily of bread and meat. Vegetables were consumed seasonally, with pumpkin, red peppers, corn, and venison dried for later use.

Clothing was made at home, generally of linen made from homegrown flax. In addition, other heavier compound fabrics known as "linsey," made of linen or cotton with woolen filling, and "jeans," made of an even heavier material and dyed brown with walnut bark, were also used.

Prior to 1831 all preparation of wool had to be done by hand at home, with the raw fiber "carded" between pairs of thin, metal spiked boards about 4 inches wide and a foot long. The resulting rolls of wool were then spun into thread upon a spinning wheel and thereby prepared for the loom.

A sexual division of labor was practiced, with women engaged in home manufactures and food preparation while men were occupied with agriculture, hunting, and construction. Since a great percentage of the land of Woodford County was tillable, farming was the principal occupation of the early settlers. Plowing was by means of wooden plows with iron shares; corn was planted by hand and covered using a hoe. Hay, often using wild rather than cultivated grass, was cut with a scythe and taken up with rakes and pitchforks.

With the advent of timber milling in the area, frame houses became possible. Settlers cooperated in construction, helping one another raise houses and barns. The latter could be 30 feet in length and width with walls perhaps 16 feet high. "It was heavy and dangerous work, and the raising of a large barn required the united energies of a whole community," one settler recalled. Other buildings commonly constructed included stables, corn-cribs, smokehouses, and ash-hoppers. Plank fences began to appear in the 1850s.

Governance by the early settlers was not by secret ballot, but by voice vote.

Antebellum years

By 1850, Woodford County was well settled; county's population topped the 5,000 mark. Illinois settlers were overwhelmingly opposed to the institution of slavery, and with the passage of the Fugitive Slave Act of 1850, popular discontent grew and opponents began to engage in acts of resistance, hiding escaped slaves seeking escape to Canada. One branch of the so-called underground railroad along which escaped slaves furtively avoided their potential captors ran directly through Woodford County.

The "stations" of the underground railroad were generally residences where escaping slaves could hide from their pursuers. These stations were located at convenient distances so that those escaping (and their "conductor" guides) could travel from one to the next in a single night.

The journey was dangerous. Wanted posters offering rewards of $50, $100, and sometimes more for specific runaway slaves were placed by slaveowners, attracting bounty hunters. Moreover, those assisting escaping slaves were themselves violators of the Fugitive Slave Law, subject to prosecution and punishment.

Local historian Roy L. Moore wrote:
There was bitter opposition to the enforcement of the fugitive slave law. This condition was not surprising, since the county had men who were strong opponents of slavery and likewise men who would make any sacrifice to have the institution stamped out. Over this branch of the underground road many a runaway slave passed on his way to freedom. There was such a strong sentiment against the [slave] traffic that conductors and stations were found in sufficient number to carry on the work successfully.

Church deacons named Mr. Dutton and Parker Morse were credited by Moore as leaders of the local anti-slavery effort. Despite the fact that these and other active conductors in the underground railroad were known to the community, popular sentiment against slavery was such that there was "very little molestation for a long time" in Woodford County. Only one instance of an arrest of a Woodford County conductor is recorded by Roy Moore in his 1910 history, and that ultimately resulted in the quashing of the indictment.

Early administrative structure

When it was first established in 1841, the county seat of Woodford County was placed in Versailles for a temporary two-year interval. Competition for the honor (and related business opportunities) was fierce leading up to the June 1843 decision of the county commissioners to tap Metamora (then known as Hanover) as the new seat. A county courthouse was begun in Metamora in 1844 and a county jail in March 1852.

It was during the pre-Civil War years that Woodford County adopted townships — which was met with strong opposition. No fewer than four public elections were held between 1850 and 1854 before the township system gained a majority of votes.

Following the division of the county into townships in early 1855, the system of county government was likewise altered, with a county commission giving way to a board of supervisors. Early county officers, including the sheriff, coroner, school commissioner, surveyor, and treasurer were elected to two-year terms of office, later changed to four-year terms.

Other claimants arose attempting to wrest the county seat from Metamora, including Eureka, El Paso, and Roanoke. El Paso was nearly awarded the seat in 1867, when it sent a local attorney to make an offer of $30,000 to the town of Metamora to relinquish the county seat. A closely contested vote ended with the apparent result in favor of El Paso reversed by a bare 10 votes in a recount.

Another vote in 1869 rejected an appeal to move the county seat to Eureka. A dubious recount in a third election held in November 1873 again overturned an apparent result to move the Woodford County seat to Roanoke. A fourth election in 1884, again proposing relocation to Roanoke, failed miserably. It was only in 1894 when a final election provided a decisive majority in favor of moving the county seat to Eureka that Metamora lost its status as county seat.

An impressive new courthouse building was quickly constructed in Eureka, cementing that town's status as legal and governmental center of Woodford County.

Civil War years

Woodford County's population continued to swell, standing at 13,281 when the American Civil War started in 1861. Support for the Union Cause was strong throughout the county; by war's end 1,643 county residents had enlisted in the Union forces – 12.4% of the population.

Calls for troops were translated into state quotas, which in Illinois was customarily apportioned to the various counties according to their population. Enlistment bonuses were paid. After 1862 when the number of volunteers ultimately failed to fulfill a state's enlistment quota, a draft was begun. Substitutes for those drafted could be sent, with prices paid by the draftee to his substitute generally ranging of $500 to $600, although prices of up to $1,000 were reportedly paid.

Woodford County's volunteers — and later on conscripts — were dispersed among a wide range of units, making a universal summary of their wartime experience impossible. Some units composed largely of residents of Woodford County, including Company G of the 17th Illinois Volunteer Infantry Regiment, mustered at Peoria May 25, 1861, and fought at the Battle of Shiloh in Hardin County, Tennessee in April 1862. Several Woodford County men were among the 130 members of the 17th Infantry killed and wounded in the two-day battle. This unit also participated in the last phase of the 1863 Siege of Vicksburg in Warren County, Mississippi, a protracted battle which led to the surrender of over 29,000 Confederate troops.

Another unit containing numerous Woodford County men was the 47th Illinois Volunteer Infantry Regiment, especially Companies B and I. Mustered into service at Peoria on August 16, 1861, the unit lost 30 killed and 100 wounded in the Battle of Corinth, Mississippi, in October 1862. The unit also suffered casualties in a May 1863 charge during the Vicksburg Campaign. After the fall of Vicksburg in July 1863, the unit spent the duration guarding railroad lines, being discharged in October of that year.

The 77th Illinois Volunteer Infantry Regiment, Companies C, F and H, also had a substantial Woodford County contingent. Serving under Maj. Gen. Gordon Granger, they participated in the initial phase of the Vicksburg Campaign. The 77th then participated in the Battle of Jackson, Mississippi (May 1863), and taking the city. Disaster struck in April 1864 near Alexandria, Louisiana, when the unit was isolated and crushed in a cavalry support operation at the Battle of Sabine Cross-roads. 176 men of the 77th Illinois were killed, wounded, or captured, leaving only 125 members of the regiment fit for duty. The unit was mustered out in July 1865, having participated in 16 battles.

Woodford County men served in numbers in Company A, 86th Illinois Volunteer Infantry Regiment, suffering losses in Kentucky at the Battle of Perryville in October 1862, and participating in Sherman's March to the Sea. Others were concentrated in Companies D and E of the 108th Illinois Volunteer Infantry Regiment, in which 205 of the 214 fatalities suffered by the regiment were due to disease rather than combat, 134 of whom died in February and March 1863 alone.

Eureka College

A leading community institution of Woodford County for more than 150 years is Eureka College, a liberal arts school affiliated with the Christian Church (Disciples of Christ). Its most noted alumnus is US President Ronald Reagan.

Eureka College traces its roots back to the summer of 1848, when a young collegian named A.S. Fisher appeared in Walnut Grove (original name of Eureka) and expressed his interest in conducting a school that would teach language, science, mathematics, and philosophy. Fisher was employed to teach school for ten months, with a number of local worthies, including many active in the Church of Christ, guaranteeing payment of his salary. This school was formally launched in September 1848. Owing to the presence of a charismatic local religious leader, the Church of Christ showed great growth during this period, adding 100 adherents in 1848, with other supporters in neighboring counties. Demand grew for transformation of the school into a seminary with room and board for students from other localities, with instructional costs to be covered through collection of tuition. In September 1849, the school was rechristened Walnut Grove Seminary and relaunched with A.S. Fisher as principal, assisted by a young woman "of superior ability and tact as a teacher." Fisher would ultimately spend 38 years associated with the college which would emerge.

In December 1849 the school was incorporated as Walnut Grove Academy. Money was collected for an expansion of the facility and a new two-story building constructed. The enterprise continued to expand and planning began for expansion of the academy into a college, with necessary buildings and a library. Appeals were made to the state Missionary Convention of the Church of Christ in 1851 and enthusiasm for establishment of a college within the church laity grew.

Geography
Most of the area is prairie land, with some bluffs originally covered with timber.

Climate and weather

Major highways

  Interstate 39
  Interstate 74
  U.S. Highway 24
  U.S. Highway 51
  U.S. Highway 150
  Illinois Route 26
  Illinois Route 89
  Illinois Route 116
  Illinois Route 117
  Illinois Route 251

Adjacent counties

 Marshall County (north)
 LaSalle County (northeast)
 Livingston County (east)
 McLean County (southeast)
 Tazewell County (southwest)
 Peoria County (west)

Demographics

As of the 2010 United States Census, there were 38,664 people, 14,276 households, and 10,675 families residing in the county. The racial makeup of the county was 97.4% White, 0.6% Asian, 0.5% Black or African American, 0.2% American Indian, 0.3% from other races, and 1.1% from two or more races. Those of Hispanic or Latino origin made up 1.4% of the population. In terms of ancestry, 48.7% were German, 14.1% were Irish, 10.9% were English, and 8.8% were American.

Of the 14,276 households, 34.8% had children under the age of 18 living with them, 63.7% were married couples living together, 7.5% had a female householder with no husband present, 25.2% were non-families, and 21.8% of all households were made up of individuals. The average household size was 2.64 and the average family size was 3.07. The median age was 39.6 years.

The median income for a household in the county was $65,890 and the median income for a family was $75,601. Males had a median income of $55,297 versus $35,435 for females. The per capita income for the county was $29,475. About 4.9% of families and 7.0% of the population were below the poverty line, including 10.6% of those under age 18 and 6.3% of those age 65 or over.

Governance
Woodford County is governed by a 15-member elected County Board, each member serving a 4-year term. Board members appoint one member to act as chair at two-year intervals. The County Board provides governing ordinances for Woodford County, establishes a budget, levies taxes, and promulgates policies and regulations for the management of government operations. The County Board holds monthly meetings. It also selects five standing committees, each with five members, which meet monthly.

The 15 members of the board are elected from three electoral districts, each electing five board members. District 1 includes Clayton, Greene, El Paso, Kansas, Linn, Minonk, Roanoke, Palestine, and Panola Townships; District 2 includes Cazenovia, Partridge, Spring Bay, and Worth Townships; and District 3 includes Cruger, Metamora, Montgomery, and Olio Townships.

Education

High schools in Woodford County

 El Paso-Gridley High School (El Paso)
 Eureka High School (Eureka)
 Fieldcrest High School (Minonk)
 Lowpoint-Washburn High School (Washburn)
 Metamora Township High School (Metamora)
 Roanoke-Benson High School (Roanoke)

Since 1949 Eureka has been a part of the Congerville-Eureka-Goodfield Community Unit School District 140. The district's coverage area totals 113 square miles. El Paso is part of the El Paso-Gridley Community Unit School District 11.

Politics
Woodford County is among the most solidly Republican counties in Illinois when it comes to presidential elections. The last Republican to receive less than 50% of the county's vote was George H. W. Bush in 1992 who still won the county. In 1964, Barry Goldwater won the county despite losing the state by nearly 19%.

Media
Early Woodford County was served by a variety of newspapers. Probably the first was the Woodford County Times (1854). By 1880 there were five weekly papers in the county: Woodford Sentinel, El Paso Journal, Eureka Journal, Minonk Blade, Washburn News. The Eureka College also produced a monthly periodical, the Eureka College Messenger.<ref>William Henry Perrin and William LeBaron, Jr., [https://archive.org/details/pastpresentofwoo00perr The Past and Present of Woodford County, Illinois: Containing a History of the County...] Chicago: W. Le Baron, Jr. & Co., 1878; 2 261.</ref>

Notable people of Woodford County

 Donald Attig (b. 1936), boat designer and yachtsman, graduated from Eureka College
 Emik Avakian (1923-2013), inventor and owner of numerous patents, graduated from Eureka College in 1948
 Emma Smith DeVoe (1848-1927), suffragist and political activist, taught at Eureka College
 J. Frank Duryea (1869-1967), a co-inventor of the gas-powered automobile, born in Washburn
 Frank Frantz (1872-1941), Rough Rider and the final Governor of Oklahoma Territory, attended Eureka College for two years in the 1880s
 Glen Gray (1900-1963), jazz saxophonist and orchestra leader, born in Roanoke, graduated from Roanoke High School (1917)0
 Oliver Perry Hay (1846-1930), professor and expert on vertebrate paleontology, graduated from Eureka College (1870).
 John S. Kyser (1900-1975), President of Northwestern State University from 1954 to 1967, born in El Paso
 Dan McCoy (b. 1978), comedian and television writer, graduate of Eureka High School (1996)
 Ralph "Mac" McKinzie (1894-1990) coached football at Eureka College for 17 seasons
 Mary Frances Winston Newson (1869-1959), mathematician and academic, taught at Eureka College
 William A. Poynter (1848-1909), 10th Governor of Nebraska, born in Eureka, graduated from Eureka College (1867)
 Neil Reagan (1908-1996), advertising executive and brother of Ronald Reagan, graduated from Eureka College (1933)
 Ronald Reagan (1911-2004), 40th President of the United States, graduated from Eureka College (1932)
 Junius P. Rodriguez (b. 1957), historian, Eureka College professor (1992– )
 Fulton J. Sheen (1895-1979), Catholic archbishop and televangelist, born in El Paso
 Andy Studebaker (b. 1985) NFL linebacker for the Indianapolis Colts, Eureka High School graduate (2004)
 Caleb TerBush (b. 1990), collegiate football quarterback at Purdue University, Metamora Township High School graduate
 Ben Zobrist (b. 1981), All-Star Major League Baseball infielder for the Oakland Athletics, born and raised in Eureka

Townships

 Cazenovia Township
 Clayton Township
 Cruger Township
 El Paso Township
 Greene Township
 Kansas Township
 Linn Township
 Metamora Township
 Minonk Township
 Montgomery Township
 Olio Township
 Palestine Township
 Panola Township
 Partridge Township
 Roanoke Township
 Spring Bay Township
 Worth Township

Communities

Cities
 El Paso (partly in McLean County)
 Eureka (Seat)
 Minonk

Villages

 Bay View Gardens
 Benson
 Congerville
 Deer Creek (partly in Tazewell County)
 Germantown Hills
 Goodfield (partly in Tazewell County)
 Kappa
 Metamora
 Panola
 Peoria Heights (mostly in Peoria County)
 Roanoke
 Secor
 Spring Bay
 Washburn (partly in Marshall County)

Unincorporated communities

 Cazenovia
 Cruger
 Lowpoint
 Woodford

See also
 National Register of Historic Places listings in Woodford County, Illinois

 Footnotes 

Further reading
 Harold Adams,  History of Eureka College, 1855-1982. Eureka, IL: Board of Trustees of Eureka College, 1982.
 John Drury, This is Woodford County, Illinois. Chicago: Loree Co., 1955.
 Eureka College, Eureka College, Eureka, Illinois, 1855-1955: A Community of Learning in Search of Truth, Human and Divine. Eureka, IL: Eureka College, [1955].
 Jephthah Hobbs, About Eureka College. Garrettsville, OH: Peirce-Sherwood Printing Co. 1894.
 William Henry Perrin and William LeBaron Jr., The Past and Present of Woodford County, Illinois: Containing a History of the County ... A Directory of Its Taxpayers; War Records of Its Volunteers in the Late Rebellion; Portraits of Early Settlers and Prominent Men; General and Local Statistics; Map of Woodford County; History of Illinois... etc. Chicago: W. Le Baron Jr. & Co., 1878.
 B.J. Radford, Autobiography of Benjamin Johnson Radford: And an Address: The Making of Woodford County. Eureka, IL: Woodford County Journal, 1977.
 Woodford County Historical Society, Woodford County Veterans: Respect and Remember. Evansville, IN: M.T. Publishing Company, 2012.
 Woodford County Sesquicentennial Committee, Souvenir History of Woodford County 1841-1991.'' Marceline, MO: Heritage House Publishing, 1991.

External links
 County website
 Woodford County Journal
 Woodford Times

 
Illinois counties
1841 establishments in Illinois
Populated places established in 1841
Peoria metropolitan area, Illinois